The Cleric Quintet is a series of five fantasy novels by American writer R. A. Salvatore, set in the Forgotten Realms campaign setting of the Dungeons & Dragons fantasy role-playing game.  They follow the story of Cadderly Bonaduce, a scholar-cleric, as he attempts to stop the "Chaos Curse" unleashed upon the world. It is also a spiritual journey for Cadderly, where he begins to see things in a new light and becomes closer to his god.

Recurring characters in this series include Cadderly Bonaduce, Danica Maupoissant, the dwarven brothers Ivan and Pikel Bouldershoulder, and Shayleigh, an elf maiden of Shilmista Forest.

Novels

Plot summary
The evil wizard Aballister has spent two years collecting and brewing a potion of power, as told to him by the imp, Druzil, sent by the Goddess of Poison, Talona. When he reveals it to his evil fellowship at the hidden stronghold Castle Trinity, the priest Barjin takes control of it and sets off to the major stronghold of the Snowflake Mountains — the Edificant Library. He finds an innocent, intelligent, and young, low-ranking priest, to open the potion, the Chaos Curse, which makes all who breathe it lose self-control. Cadderly must fight a memory-blocking spell in order to lift the curse and save the Library.

Creation
The character of Cadderly was created specially for the Cleric Quintet, after six Drizzt books were completed – as Salvatore wrote in his introduction, "We were done with Drizzt. Or at least, we thought we were". The new protagonist was originally planned to be a monk, but it got rejected due to changes in Dungeons & Dragons 2nd Edition, where the class of monks was absent. Mary Kirchoff proposed that the protagonist should be a cleric. Salvatore invented a concept of spiritual journey for his character, who initially treats his religion as just a lifestyle, but gradually becomes more tied to his god, Deneir.

Reviews
Science Fiction Chronicle

References

External links
R.A. Salvatore introduction
Review
RPGnet review

American fantasy novels
Book series introduced in 1991
Dwarves in popular culture
Forgotten Realms novel series
Novels by R. A. Salvatore